Io Semiramide (AKA: I Am Semiramis, AKA: Slave Queen of Babylon, AKA: Duelo de Reyes) is a 1963 film about Semiramis, a queen of the Neo-Assyrian Empire. It was directed by Primo Zeglio. The legends are in part based on the historical Shammuramat, queen consort of Shamshi-Adad V and regent for her son Adad-nirari III.

Plot
During the reign of Semiramis, the beautiful queen of the Assyrian people, Assyria reaches one of the periods of greatest splendour, and to crown her successes she gives the order to build the great city of Babylon. A young woman of the court of great political ambition, Semiramis falls in love with Kir, a prince enslaved who reciprocates. Kir, king of the Dardanians, is defeated in combat by General Onnos during a military campaign launched by the latter against Nineveh in Assyria.

Reduced to slavery, Kir is taken with other slaves to the capital where the general presents his prizes to King Minurte. Semiramis persuades Minurte to offer him Kir and also obtains a domain. She employs her slaves, including Kir, to build a city that becomes Babylon. Meanwhile, she leads political machinations and alliances with Kir and Onnos in order to overthrow Minurte and take her place on the throne.

The conspirators manage to take Kir from the queen and convince him that he has been betrayed by Semiramis with another man. Furious, Kir takes charge of the conspiracy against his beloved. Discovering the truth, Semiramis poisons Kir by making him drink from a poisoned cup. Later, during the funeral, the queen is shot by an arrow thrown by the conspirators. The bodies of the two lovers are then burned together, united in death.

Cast
Yvonne Furneaux as "Semiramis"
John Ericson as "Kir"
Renzo Ricci as "Minurte"
Germano Longo as "Onnos"
Gianni Rizzo as "Ghelas"
John Bartha as "Althar"
Nino di Napoli as "Adath"

See also
 List of historical drama films and series set in Near Eastern and Western civilization
 War Gods of Babylon (1962)
 Queen of Babylon (1954)
 The Beast of Babylon Against the Son of Hercules (1963)

References

External links
 

1960s historical films
1960s historical drama films
1963 films
1963 drama films
1960s adventure drama films
1960s action adventure films
Sword and sandal films
Historical epic films
Romantic epic films
Italian historical romance films
1960s historical romance films
Italian romantic drama films
Italian historical adventure films
Italian action adventure films
1960s Italian-language films
English-language Italian films
Films set in ancient Mesopotamia
Films about royalty
Films based on mythology
Films set in the 7th century BC
Films set in Babylon
Peplum films
Films directed by Primo Zeglio
Films scored by Carlo Savina
Films about conspiracy theories
Neo-Assyrian Empire
Assyrian culture
1960s Italian films
Semiramis